Khitan or Kitan ( in large script or  in small, Khitai; , Qìdānyǔ), also known as Liao, is a now-extinct language once spoken in Northeast Asia by the Khitan people (4th to 13th century). It was the official language of the Liao Empire (907–1125) and the Qara Khitai (1124–1218).

Classification
Khitan appears to have been related to the Mongolic languages; Juha Janhunen states,  conception is gaining support that Khitan was a language in some respects radically different from the historically known Mongolic languages. If this view proves to be correct, Khitan is, indeed, best classified as a Para-Mongolic language."

Alexander Vovin (2017) argues that Khitan has several Koreanic loanwords. Since both of the Korean Goryeo dynasty and Khitan Liao dynasty claimed to be successors of Goguryeo, it is possible that the Koreanic words in Khitan were borrowed from the language of Goguryeo.

Script
Khitan was written using two mutually exclusive writing systems known as the Khitan large script and the Khitan small script. The small script, which was a syllabary, was used until the Jurchen-speaking Jin dynasty (1115–1234) replaced it in 1191. The large script was logographic like Chinese.

Records 
The History of Liao contains a volume of Khitan words transcribed in Chinese characters titled "Glossary of National Language" (國語解). It is found in Chapter 116.

The Qianlong Emperor of the Qing dynasty erroneously identified the Khitan people and their language with the Solons, leading him to use the Solon language to "correct" Chinese character transcriptions of Khitan names in the History of Liao in his Imperial Liao-Jin-Yuan Three Histories National Language Explanation (欽定遼金元三史國語解) project.

The Liao dynasty referred to the Khitan language with the term Guoyu (國語, "National language"), which was also used by other non-Han Chinese dynasties in China to refer to their languages like Manchu of the Qing, Classical Mongolian during the Yuan dynasty, Jurchen during the Jin, and Xianbei during the Northern Wei. Even today, Mandarin is referred to in Taiwan as Guoyu.

Vocabulary 
There are several closed systems of Khitan lexical items for which systematic information is available. The following is a list of words in these closed systems that are similar to Mongolic. Mongolian and Daur equivalents are given after the English translation:

Seasons

Numerals

Compared with Khitan, The Tungusic numerals of the Jurchen language differ significantly: three=ilan, five=shunja, seven=nadan, nine=uyun, hundred=tangu.

Animals

Directions

Time

Personal relations

Tribal administration

Basic verbs

Natural objects

The Liaoshi records in Chapter 53:

'Tao Saiyier' corresponds to Mongolian 'tavan sar' (fifth moon/month). The Turkic Kyrgyz equivalent would be 'beshinchi ay' while the Manchu (Tungusic) equivalent would be 'sunja biya'.

References

Bibliography

Further reading

External links

 New Developments of the Studies on Khitai Language and Khitai Scripts

 
Languages attested from the 10th century
Agglutinative languages
Mongolic–Khitan languages
Languages of China
Medieval languages
Extinct languages of Asia
Khitans